Alex Santana (born 1995) is a Brazilian footballer.

Alex Santana may also refer to:
Alex Muralha (born 1989), full name Alex Roberto Santana Rafael, Brazilian footballer
Alex Santana (baseball), American baseball player

See also

Alexi Santana